Slivno may refer to:

 Slivno, Dubrovnik-Neretva County, a municipality in southern Croatia
 Slivno, Slovenia, a village near Laško, Slovenia
 Slivno, Split-Dalmatia County, a village near Runovići, Croatia
 Slivno, Šibenik-Knin County, a village near Šibenik, Croatia
 Slivno, Breza, a village near Breza, Bosnia and Herzegovina